Shardonem is a rural locality (a village) in Karpogorskoye Rural Settlement of Pinezhsky District, Arkhangelsk Oblast, Russia. The population was 366 as of 2010. The locality has 3 streets.

Geography 
Shardonem is located 15 km from Karpogory on the Pinega River, 15 km southeast of Karpogory (the district's administrative centre) by road. Yerkino is the nearest rural locality.

References 

Rural localities in Pinezhsky District
Pinezhsky Uyezd